"Gold Dust Woman" is a song from British-American rock band Fleetwood Mac's 11th studio album, Rumours (1977). The song was written and sung by Stevie Nicks and released as a B-side to the "Don't Stop" single (in the UK) and the "You Make Loving Fun" single (in the US).

The 2004 two-disc special edition release of Rumours includes two demos of "Gold Dust Woman". One demo features vocal melody and lyrics in the coda which would later be developed into the stand-alone single "If You Ever Did Believe" in 1997, which Nicks recorded with Sheryl Crow as part of the early sessions for her 2001 Trouble in Shangri-La album. However, the track, "If You Ever Did Believe" was instead chosen as the theme song for the 1998 Warner Bros. film Practical Magic, starring Sandra Bullock and Nicole Kidman, and is only available on the film's soundtrack album.

Background
The take chosen for release on the 1977 Rumours album was reportedly recorded at 4 a.m., after a long night of attempts in the studio. Just before and during the final take, Stevie Nicks had wrapped her head (though not mouth) with a black scarf, veiling her senses to tap memories and emotions. Many unusual instruments were used in the recording, including an electric harpsichord with a jet phaser, which was marked with tape so Mick Fleetwood could play the right notes. To accentuate Nicks's vocals, Fleetwood broke sheets of glass. According to producer Ken Caillat "He [Fleetwood] was wearing goggles and coveralls — it was pretty funny. He just went mad, bashing glass with this big hammer. He tried to do it on cue, but it was difficult. Eventually, we said, 'Just break the glass,' and we fit it all in."

The song's title, "Gold Dust Woman", comes from Gold Dust Lane, a street in Wickenburg, Arizona where Nicks spent time as a child.

Slant Magazine critic Barry Walsh described the song as finding Nicks "at her folky (not flaky) best with one of her most poignant character studies".

Interpretations
When asked about the song in an interview with Courtney Love for Spin in October 1997, Nicks confirmed that "gold dust" was in fact a metaphor for cocaine.

In an interview for VH1's Classic Album series, Nicks offered further insight into the song's meaning:

Personnel
 Stevie Nicks – lead vocals
 Lindsey Buckingham – guitars, dobro, backing vocals
 Mick Fleetwood – drums, cowbell, electric harpsichord (processed), sound effects
 Christine McVie – Fender Rhodes, backing vocals
 John McVie – bass guitar

Certifications

Hole version
A cover version by the American alternative rock band Hole was released on Geffen Records in 1996 as their ninth CD single. It was also featured on the soundtrack to The Crow: City of Angels and was produced by Ric Ocasek of the Cars.

Charts

Other covers
A cover version by Waylon Jennings was released on the Waylon and Willie album in 1978.

References

External links
The Penguin: GDW Lyric Interpretations

Fleetwood Mac songs
Hole (band) songs
1977 songs
1996 singles
Songs written by Stevie Nicks
Song recordings produced by Ken Caillat
Song recordings produced by Richard Dashut
Songs about drugs
Geffen Records singles
Warner Records singles
Songs about cocaine